Promisedland is a rural locality in the Bundaberg Region, Queensland, Australia. In the  Promisedland had a population of 29 people.

Geography 
The Burnett River forms the north-western boundary of the locality. The Ned Churchward Weir (originally called the Walla Weir) was built in 1998 across the river between Promisedland and Bungadoo to provide water for irrigation.

History 
In the  Promisedland had a population of 29 people.

References 

Bundaberg Region
Localities in Queensland